Live: Hallelujah is a live album by Sammy Hagar and The Waboritas.

Track list 
 "Shaka Doobie (The Limit)" (Sammy Hagar) – 3:30
 originally from Hagar's Ten 13 album.
 recorded at the Mars Music Amphitheater in Tampa, Florida, on July 31, 2002.
 "Three Lock Box" (Sammy Hagar) – 3:40
 originally from Hagar's Three Lock Box album.
 recorded at the UMB Bank Pavilion in Maryland Heights, Missouri, on June 7, 2002.
 "There's Only One Way to Rock" (Sammy Hagar) – 4:05
  originally from Hagar's Standing Hampton album.
 recorded at the UMB Bank Pavilion in Maryland Heights, Missouri, on June 7, 2002.
 "Give to Live" (Sammy Hagar) - 4:08
 originally from Hagar's I Never Said Goodbye album.
 recorded at the UMB Bank Pavilion in Maryland Heights, Missouri, on June 7, 2002.
 "Top of the World" (Michael Anthony/Sammy Hagar/Alex Van Halen/Edward Van Halen) – 3:50
 originally from Van Halen's For Unlawful Carnal Knowledge album.
 recorded at the UMB Bank Pavilion in Maryland Heights, Missouri, on June 7, 2002.
 "Deeper Kinda Love" (Larry Dvoskin/Sammy Hagar) – 4:27
 originally from Hagar's Ten 13 album.
 recorded at the UMB Bank Pavilion in Maryland Heights, Missouri, on June 7, 2002.
 "Why Can't This Be Love" (Michael Anthony/Sammy Hagar/Alex Van Halen/Edward Van Halen) – 3:46
 originally from Van Halen's 5150 album.
 recorded at the UMB Bank Pavilion in Maryland Heights, Missouri, on June 7, 2002.
 "Eagles Fly" (Sammy Hagar) – 5:02
 originally from Hagar's I Never Said Goodbye album.
 recorded at the UMB Bank Pavilion in Maryland Heights, Missouri, on June 7, 2002.
 "Little White Lie" (Sammy Hagar) – 3:41
 originally from Hagar's Marching To Mars album.
 recorded at the UMB Bank Pavilion in Maryland Heights, Missouri, on June 7, 2002.
 "Rock Candy" (Denny Carmassi/Bill Church/Sammy Hagar/Ronnie Montrose) – 4:40
 originally from Montrose's first album, Montrose.
 recorded at the Mars Music Amphitheater in Tampa, Florida, on July 31, 2002.
 "I Can't Drive 55" (Sammy Hagar) – 4:55
 originally from Hagar's VOA album.
 recorded at the UMB Bank Pavilion in Maryland Heights, Missouri, on June 7, 2002.
 "Mas Tequila" (Gary Glitter/Sammy Hagar/Mike Leander) – 5:19
 originally from Hagar's Red Voodoo album.
 recorded at the UMB Bank Pavilion in Maryland Heights, Missouri, on June 7, 2002.
 "Heavy Metal" (Sammy Hagar/Jim Peterik) – 4:47
 originally from Hagar's Standing Hampton album.
 recorded at the UMB Bank Pavilion in Maryland Heights, Missouri, on June 7, 2002.
 "When It's Love" (Michael Anthony/Sammy Hagar/Alex Van Halen/Edward Van Halen) – 5:38
 originally from Van Halen's OU812 album.
 recorded at the Tweeter Center For The Performing Arts in Mansfield, Massachusetts, on August 28, 2002.
 "Right Now" (Michael Anthony/Sammy Hagar/Alex Van Halen/Edward Van Halen) – 5:35
 originally from Van Halen's For Unlawful Carnal Knowledge album.
 recorded at the Verizon Wireless Amphitheater in Charlotte, North Carolina, on August 7, 2002.
 "Dreams" (Michael Anthony/Sammy Hagar/Alex Van Halen/Edward Van Halen) – 4:59
 originally from Van Halen's 5150 album.
 recorded at the Selland Arena in Fresno, California, on June 27, 2002.
 "Hallelujah" (Sammy Hagar) – 4:17
 originally from Hagar's Not 4 Sale album.
 the same studio track as on Not 4 Sale.

Personnel
 Sammy Hagar: lead vocals and guitar
 Victor Johnson: guitar
 Jesse Harms: keyboards
 Mona Gnader: bass guitar
 David Lauser: drums

Special guests
 Michael Anthony: bass guitar and background vocals on "Top of the World", "When It's Love", "Right Now" and "Dreams"
 Gary Cherone: duet lead vocal with Hagar on "When It's Love"
 Pat Badger, Fran Sheehan, Sib Hashian, Barry Goudreau: backing vocals on "When It's Love"

Singles
 "Hallelujah" b/w "Right Now (live)" (Sanctuary SANDJ-85553-2)

Versions
 Sanctuary (Europe) : MISCD026
 Sanctuary (UK) : MISPRO26
 Sanctuary (US) : SANSP-84608-2
 Sanctuary (Japan) : PCCY-01675

External links
Lyrics from Hagar's official web site 

Sammy Hagar albums
2003 live albums